Seetha is a 1990 Indian Tamil language thriller film directed by S. A. Chandrasekhar. The film stars Rahman, Kanaka, R. Sarathkumar and Gautami, with Charan Raj, Janagaraj, Manorama, Radha Ravi, S. Shankar, Srividya and Delhi Ganesh playing supporting roles. It was released on 14 April 1990. The film was dubbed in Telugu with same name.

Plot

The film begins with Seetha (Kanaka) returning to her native village after completing her studies in the city. Seetha and her parents lead a peaceful life until Boopathy, the son of the village zamindar, crosses her path. Boopathy spread terror among the villagers and he now wants to marry Seetha but she refuses. So Boopathy, who was very upset and frustrated by her refusal, kills her father. Seetha and her mother have no other choice than to flee the village.

In the city, Seetha finds a decent job and rents a house. On the other hand, Boopathy is still far from having forgotten Seetha so he tracks them the way to their house. He continues to ruin Seetha's life. One day, the police inspector Vijay (Rahman) comes to her rescue. He eventually falls in love with her and they get married afterwards. After the marriage, Vijay is arrested for a crime he did not commit. The journalist Jhansi Rani (Gautami) decides to save Seetha from Boopathy. Whereas Rathnaraj (R. Sarathkumar), a corrupt politician and Jhansi's husband, joins hand with Boopathy. What transpires next forms the rest of the story.

Cast

Rahman as Vijay
Kanaka as Seetha
R. Sarathkumar as Rathnaraj
Gautami as Jhansi Rani
Charan Raj as Boopathy
Janagaraj as Boopathy's father
Manorama as Boopathy's mother
Radha Ravi as Chakravarthy
S. Shankar as Japan
Srividya as Meenakshi, Seetha's mother
Delhi Ganesh as Nakkeeran, Seetha's father
Yuvasri as Shanthi, Boopathy's sister
Sharmili as Hams
Super Subbarayan
Chitti

Soundtrack

The film score and the soundtrack were composed by Vidyasagar. The soundtrack, released in 1990, features 5 tracks with lyrics written by Vaali and Pulamaipithan.

References

1990 films
1990s Tamil-language films
Indian thriller films
Films scored by Vidyasagar
Films directed by S. A. Chandrasekhar
1990 thriller films